Hovland may refer to:

Places
Hovland, Minnesota, U.S.
Hoffland or Hovland, a village in Ålesund, Norway

People with the surname
Carl Hovland (1912–1961), American psychologist
Egil Hovland (1924–2013), Norwegian composer
Even Hovland (born 1989), Norwegian footballer
Frank Hovland (born 1960), Norwegian rock musician and music producer
George Hovland (1926–2021), American skier
Ingeborg Hovland (born 1969), Norwegian footballer
Julie Hovland, wife of Telly Savalas
Viktor Hovland (born 1997), Norwegian golfer

Other uses
9069 Hovland, an asteroid

Norwegian-language surnames